In Old Alsace may refer to:
 In Old Alsace (1933 film), a French drama film
 In Old Alsace (1920 film), a French silent film